Genesis 4 may refer to:

 Cain and Abel, the focus of the fourth chapter of the biblical Book of Genesis.
 GENESIS 4, the fourth iteration of the smash tournament series Genesis (tournament)

04